Vila Leopoldina is a district in the subprefecture of Lapa in the city of São Paulo, Brazil.

Districts of São Paulo